Tambja abdere is a species of sea slug, a dorid nudibranch, a marine gastropod mollusk in the family Polyceridae.

Distribution
The type locality of this species is La Paz, Baja California, Mexico. The original description reports additional observations from Punta Lobos, Guaymas, Danzante Island, San Diego Island and San Francisco Island, Mexico.

References

Polyceridae
Gastropods described in 1978